Carposina exsanguis is a moth in the family Carposinidae. It was described by Edward Meyrick in 1918. It is found in South Africa.

References

Endemic moths of South Africa
Carposinidae
Moths described in 1918
Moths of Africa